George Washington Benson (born March 22, 1943) is an American guitarist, singer, and songwriter. He began his professional career at the age of 19 as a jazz guitarist.

A former child prodigy, Benson first came to prominence in the 1960s, playing soul jazz with Jack McDuff and others. He then launched a successful solo career, alternating between jazz, pop, R&B singing, and scat singing. His album Breezin' was certified triple-platinum, hitting no. 1 on the Billboard album chart in 1976. His concerts were well attended through the 1980s, and he still has a large following. Benson has won ten Grammy Awards and has been honored with a star on the Hollywood Walk of Fame.

Biography

Early career 
Benson was born and raised in the Hill District of Pittsburgh, Pennsylvania. At the age of seven, he first played the ukulele in a corner drug store, for which he was paid a few dollars. At age eight, he played guitar in an unlicensed nightclub on Friday and Saturday nights, but the police soon closed the club down. At  age nine, he started to record. Out of the four sides he cut, two were released: "She Makes Me Mad" backed with "It Should Have Been Me", with RCA Victor in New York; although one source indicates this record was released under the name "Little Georgie", the 45rpm label is printed with the name George Benson.  The single was produced by Leroy Kirkland for RCA's rhythm and blues label, Groove Records. As he has stated in an interview, Benson's introduction to show business had an effect on his schooling. 

Benson attended and graduated from Schenley High School. As a youth he learned how to play straight-ahead instrumental jazz during a relationship performing for several years with organist Jack McDuff. One of his many early guitar heroes was country-jazz guitarist Hank Garland. At the age of 21, he recorded his first album as leader, The New Boss Guitar, featuring McDuff. Benson's next recording was It's Uptown with the George Benson Quartet, including Lonnie Smith on organ and Ronnie Cuber on baritone saxophone. Benson followed it up with The George Benson Cookbook, also with Lonnie Smith and Ronnie Cuber on baritone and drummer Marion Booker. Miles Davis employed Benson in the mid-1960s, featuring his guitar on "Paraphernalia" on his 1968 Columbia release, Miles in the Sky before Benson went to Verve Records.

Benson then signed with Creed Taylor's jazz label CTI Records, where he recorded several albums, with jazz heavyweights guesting, to some success, mainly in the jazz field. His 1974 release, Bad Benson, climbed to the top spot in the Billboard jazz chart, while the follow-ups, Good King Bad (#51 Pop album) and Benson & Farrell (with Joe Farrell), both reached the jazz top-three sellers. Benson also did a version of The Beatles's 1969 album Abbey Road called The Other Side of Abbey Road, also released in 1969, and a version of "White Rabbit", originally written and recorded by San Francisco rock group Great Society, and made famous by Jefferson Airplane. Benson played on numerous sessions for other CTI artists during this time, including Freddie Hubbard and Stanley Turrentine, notably on the latter's acclaimed album Sugar.

1970s and 1980s 

By the mid-to-late 1970s, as he recorded for Warner Bros. Records, a whole new audience began to discover Benson. On 1976's Breezin', Benson sang a lead vocal on the track "This Masquerade" (notable also for the lush, romantic piano intro and solo by Jorge Dalto), which became a huge pop hit and won a Grammy Award for Record of the Year. (He had sung vocals infrequently on albums earlier in his career, notably his rendition of "Here Comes the Sun" on The Other Side of Abbey Road album.) The rest of the album is instrumental, including his rendition of the 1975 Jose Feliciano composition "Affirmation".

In 1976, Benson toured with soul singer Minnie Riperton, who had been diagnosed with terminal breast cancer earlier that year and, in addition, appeared as a guitarist and backup vocalist on Stevie Wonder's song "Another Star" from Wonder's album Songs in the Key of Life.

During the same year, 1976, the top selling album Breezin' was released on the Warner Brothers label featuring the Bobby Womack penned title track and the Leon Russell penned "This Masquerade" which is now a jazz standard. Both tracks won Grammy Awards that year, and the album put Benson into the musical limelight both in the US and in Europe. Ironically, up until this time Benson had been discouraged from using his singing skills, mainly because the company decision-makers felt he was not competent enough vocally, and he should stick to playing the guitar.

He also recorded the original version of "The Greatest Love of All" for the 1977 Muhammad Ali bio-pic, The Greatest, which was later covered by Whitney Houston as "Greatest Love of All." During this time Benson recorded with the German conductor Claus Ogerman. The live take of "On Broadway," recorded a few months later from the 1978 release Weekend in L.A., also won a Grammy. He has worked with Freddie Hubbard on a number of his albums throughout the 1960s, 1970s and 1980s.

The Qwest record label (a subsidiary of Warner Bros., run by Quincy Jones) released Benson's breakthrough pop album Give Me The Night, produced by Jones. Benson made it into the pop and R&B top ten with the song "Give Me the Night" (written by former Heatwave keyboardist Rod Temperton). He had many hit singles such as "Love All the Hurt Away," "Turn Your Love Around," "Inside Love," "Lady Love Me," "20/20," "Shiver," "Kisses in the Moonlight."  More importantly, Quincy Jones encouraged Benson to search his roots for further vocal inspiration, and he rediscovered his love for Nat King Cole, Ray Charles and Donny Hathaway in the process, influencing a string of further vocal albums into the 1990s. Despite returning to his jazz and guitar playing most recently, this theme was reflected again much later in Benson's 2000 release Absolute Benson, featuring a cover of one of Hathaway's most notable songs, "The Ghetto." Benson accumulated three other platinum LPs and two gold albums.

1990s to present 

In 1990, Benson was awarded an Honorary Doctorate of Music from the Berklee College of Music.

To commemorate the long relationship between Benson and Ibanez and to celebrate 30 years of collaboration on the GB Signature Models, Ibanez created the GB30TH, a limited-edition model with a gold-foil finish inspired by the traditional Japanese Garahaku art form. In 2009, Benson was recognized by the National Endowment of the Arts as a Jazz Master, the United States highest honor in jazz. Benson performed at the 49th issue of the Ohrid Summer Festival in North Macedonia on July 25, 2009, and his tribute show to Nat King Cole An Unforgettable Tribute to Nat King Cole as part of the Istanbul International Jazz Festival in Turkey on July 27. In the fall of 2009, Benson finished recording an album entitled Songs and Stories with Marcus Miller, producer John Burk, and session musicians David Paich and Steve Lukather. As a part of the promotion for his album Songs and Stories, Benson has appeared or performed on The Tavis Smiley Show, Jimmy Kimmel Live! and Late Night with Jimmy Fallon.

He performed at the Java Jazz Festival March 4–6, 2011. In 2011, Benson released the album Guitar Man, revisiting his 1960s/early-1970s guitar-playing roots with a 12-song collection of covers of both jazz and pop standards produced by John Burk.

In June 2013, Benson released his fourth album for Concord, Inspiration: A Tribute to Nat King Cole, which included Wynton Marsalis, Idina Menzel, Till Brönner, and Judith Hill. In September, he returned to perform at Rock in Rio festival, in Rio de Janeiro, 35 years after his first performance at this festival, which was then the inaugural one.

In July 2016, Benson participated as a mentor in the Sky Arts programme Guitar Star in the search for the UK and Republic of Ireland's most talented guitarist.

In May 2018, Benson was featured on the Gorillaz single "Humility".

On July 12, 2018, it was announced that Benson had signed to Mascot Label Group.

Personal life 
Benson has been married to Johnnie Lee since 1962 and has seven children. Benson describes his music as focusing more on love and romance, due to his commitment to his family and religious practices, with Benson being a Jehovah's Witness. Benson has been a resident of Englewood, New Jersey.

Discography

Awards

Grammy Awards 
List of Grammy Awards received by George Benson

References

External links 

1943 births
Living people
20th-century African-American male singers
20th-century American guitarists
21st-century African-American male singers
21st-century American guitarists
African-American guitarists
African-American jazz guitarists
African-American songwriters
American funk guitarists
American jazz composers
American jazz guitarists
American jazz singers
American Jehovah's Witnesses
American male guitarists
American male jazz composers
American male singer-songwriters
American rhythm and blues guitarists
American soul guitarists
Columbia Records artists
Concord Records artists
Converts to Jehovah's Witnesses
CTI Records artists
Grammy Award winners
Groove Records artists
GRP Records artists
Guitarists from Arizona
Guitarists from Pennsylvania
Jazz musicians from Pennsylvania
Lead guitarists
Musicians from Phoenix, Arizona
Musicians from Pittsburgh
People from Englewood, New Jersey
Prestige Records artists
Schenley High School alumni
Singer-songwriters from Arizona
Singer-songwriters from Pennsylvania
Smooth jazz guitarists
Verve Records artists
Warner Records artists